Ab Garm (also Romanized as Āb Garm and Āb-i-Garm) is a village in Efzar Rural District, Efzar District, Qir and Karzin County, Fars Province, Iran. At the 2006 census, its population was 544, in 111 families.

References 

Populated places in Qir and Karzin County